Stephanie Kyriacou (born 22 November 2000) is an Australian professional golfer. She won the 2020 Australian Ladies Classic Bonville by eight strokes as an amateur and joined the Ladies European Tour on a two-year winner's exemption.

Career
Kyriacou started to play golf aged four and came through the Jack Newton Junior Golf Programme and played in her first Jack Newton golf tournament, the 2011 State Junior Medals, when she was 10.

In January 2020, Kyriacou won the first tournament of the 2020 Ladies European Tour season, the Australian Ladies Classic Bonville at Bonville Golf Resort in New South Wales. She won by eight strokes over the world number 35 Ayean Cho of Korea, with a total of 22-under-par. Her second round of 63 was the lowest score ever recorded at Bonville but not a course record as preferred lies were used.  Her tournament victory was the 10th by an amateur in the 42-year history of the LET.

Kyriacou earned a two-year exemption on the Ladies European Tour but was unable to collect the €36,000 prize money on offer at Bonville due to her amateur status. She turned professional two days later, on 25 January, ahead of making her professional debut in the Women's NSW Open at Dubbo Golf Club, where she missed the cut.

When competitive play resumed again in the second half of 2020, Kyriacou made the cut at her first major, the 2020 Women's British Open. She was runner-up at the Ladies Swiss Open behind Amy Boulden and fifth at both the Czech Ladies Open and the Lacoste Ladies Open de France.

In 2021, Kyriacou won her second LET title and her first as a professional after she shot a bogey-free final round of 67 to win the Big Green Egg Open by two strokes ahead of Finland's Sanna Nuutinen.

Kyriacou earned her card for the 2022 LPGA Tour through qualifying school.

Endorsements
Titleist, Under Armour, Aphrodite Hills Resort - Cyprus, Lending Association and Golf Australia

Amateur wins
2017 Port Phillip Open Amateur & Victorian Women's Amateur
2019 Australian Master of the Amateurs, Port Phillip Open Amateur, Queensland Amateur Championship

Source:

Professional wins

Ladies European Tour wins (2)

^Co-sanctioned by the ALPG Tour

Results in LPGA majors

CUT = missed the half-way cut
NT = no tournament
T = tied

LPGA Tour career summary

^ Official as of 2022 season
*Includes matchplay and other tournaments without a cut.

References

External links

Australian female golfers
ALPG Tour golfers
Ladies European Tour golfers
LPGA Tour golfers
Golfers from Sydney
2000 births
Living people